František Havránek (11 July 1923 – 26 March 2011) was a Czech football manager and former player. He had a daughter, Dagmar Havránková (Karakolevová). 

As a player, Havránek played for several lower-division Czechoslovak clubs, but never gained any success with them . He was far more successful as a football coach. After finishing his active career, Havránek started to work as a football manager. He coached Spartak Hradec Králové, Slavia Prague and FC Zbrojovka Brno in Czechoslovakia. Havránek also managed Cypriot EPA Larnaca, AEL Limassol and Polish Ruch Chorzów. In 1970, he won the Cypriot First Division with EPA Larnaca. In 1985, he won the Cypriot Cup with AEL Limassol. Two years later he returned to Czechoslovakia and ended his coaching career.

As a coach of the Czechoslovak Olympic team at the 1980 Summer Olympics, he won the gold medal with his team. From 1978 to 1984 he was a general manager of the Czechoslovakia national football team, coaching the team from 1982 to 1984.

References

External links
 
  SK Slavia Praha profile

1923 births
2011 deaths
Czech footballers
Czechoslovak footballers
FK Mladá Boleslav players
Czech football managers
Czech expatriate football managers
Czechoslovak football managers
Czechoslovak expatriate football managers
SK Slavia Prague managers
FC Zbrojovka Brno managers
Ruch Chorzów managers
Czechoslovakia national football team managers
Czechoslovak expatriate sportspeople in Poland
Expatriate football managers in Poland
Expatriate football managers in Cyprus
AEL Limassol managers
Association football midfielders
Czechoslovak expatriate sportspeople in Cyprus
Footballers from Bratislava
FC Hradec Králové managers